Jinghai District, formerly Jinghai County, is a district of Tianjin, China.
Jinghai Town, the seat of Jinghai District

Jinghai may also refer to:

Tĩnh Hải quân or Jinghai Circuit, Tang dynasty military command in modern Vietnam
Jinghai County (Nantong), historical county in modern Nantong, China
Jinghai station, Wuxi metro 
Jinghai Temple, Nanjing, China